Jílovice is a municipality and village in České Budějovice District in the South Bohemian Region of the Czech Republic. It has about 1,000 inhabitants.

Administrative parts
Villages of Jiterní Ves, Kojákovice, Kramolín, Lipnice, Nepomuk, Šalmanovice and Vlachnovice are administrative parts of Jílovice.

References

Villages in České Budějovice District